Matti Järvinen (1909–1985), was a Finnish economist and as a young man javelin thrower.

Matti Järvinen may also refer to:

Matti Järvinen (ice hockey, born 1984), Finnish hockey goaltender
Matti Järvinen (ice hockey, born 1989), Finnish ice hockey player

See also
Järvinen, surname